Mohamed Moawad  (born ) is an Egyptian male volleyball player. He was part of the Egypt men's national volleyball team at the 2014 FIVB Volleyball Men's World Championship in Poland. He played for Al Ahly.

Clubs
 Al Ahly (2014)

References

1987 births
Living people
Egyptian men's volleyball players
Place of birth missing (living people)
Olympic volleyball players of Egypt
Al Ahly (men's volleyball) players